In Requiem is Paradise Lost's eleventh studio album, again with Rhys Fulber on production duties. Greek artist Seth Siro Anton, from metal band Septicflesh, was responsible for the artwork.

The song "Sedative God" was originally intended for the previous Paradise Lost album, but was never recorded at that time. Drummer Jeff Singer, who played on the aforementioned album, was not an official member of the band back then until the first single of this album The Enemy, although he left Paradise Lost one year after this album's release.

The album features some harsher vocals by Nick Holmes, similar to the style he had on Icon.

The title for song "Praise Lamented Shade" comes after An Essay on Criticism by Alexander Pope.

Track listing 
All tracks by Nick Holmes and Greg MacKintosh.

Credits 
 Nick Holmes – vocals
 Greg Mackintosh  – lead guitar
 Aaron Aedy – rhythm guitar
 Steve Edmondson – bass
 Jeff Singer – drums

Charts

References 

Paradise Lost (band) albums
2007 albums
Century Media Records albums
Albums with cover art by Spiros Antoniou
Albums produced by Rhys Fulber